Tadeusz Socha (born 15 February 1988 in Wrocław) is a Polish football defender who last played for Sandecja Nowy Sącz.

Honours

Club
Śląsk Wrocław
 Ekstraklasa: 2011–12
 Ekstraklasa Cup: 2008–09
 Polish Super Cup: 2012

Arka Gdynia
 I liga: 2015–16
 Polish Cup: 2016–17
 Polish Super Cup: 2017, 2018

References

External links 
 
 

1988 births
Living people
Polish footballers
Poland under-21 international footballers
Śląsk Wrocław players
Bytovia Bytów players
Arka Gdynia players
Sandecja Nowy Sącz players
Ekstraklasa players
I liga players
Sportspeople from Wrocław
Association football defenders